Vasanello is a comune (municipality) in the Province of Viterbo in the Italian region Lazio, located about  north of GRA (Rome) and about  east of Viterbo.

Main sights
Orsini castle (12th century). It is a tuff construction with four cylindrical towers
Santa Maria Assunta - 11th-century church built over a former Roman temple.
San Salvatore - 11th century church also in tuff. It has a 13th-century bell tower with mullioned windows and Ancient Roman spolia.

Twin towns
 Åsnes, Norway
 Dschang, Cameroon

References

External links
 Official website

Cities and towns in Lazio